Cyril Gossard (born 7 February 1982) is a rugby league footballer who most recently played for the Catalans Dragons in the Super League.

Background
Gossard was born in France.

Career
Gossard made 93 appearances for Catalans between 2006 and 2012. In 2014, he became the head coach of St Esteve XIII Catalan. On 13 November 2015, Gossard stepped down as head coach of St Esteve XIII Catalan for personal reasons.

References

External links

1982 births
Living people
Catalans Dragons players
France national rugby league team players
French rugby league players
Rugby league second-rows